The Avian 2/180 Gyroplane was a two-seat, single-engine autogyro built in Canada in the 1960s. Several prototypes were built but production was not achieved.

Development

Avian Aircraft was started by Peter Payne and colleagues from the Avro Canada company specifically to build a modern autogyro.

The Gyroplane prototype first flew in Spring 1960.  It was later lost in a crash. The compressed air jump start system was not a success, so the second prototype used the engine, connected via a belt, clutch and gear box.  This aircraft was also made lighter than the first with more use of aluminium and fibreglass, increasing cruising speed by 25%.  It was followed by three pre-production aircraft.  By the end of 1963 more than 300 flying hours were completed.  In December 1964 Avian received a $540,000 Canadian government contract to build a modified Gyroplane that would take the type to Certification.  This was achieved late in 1968.

In 1970 Avian Ltd went into receivership.  Although there were later hopes of a revival, nothing came of them. In 1972 some assets of Avian, including three Gyroplanes, were put up for sale, but no purchase is recorded.  However, in 2002 one surviving Gyroplane and its certification rights were sold to Pegasus Rotorcraft Ltd, who renamed it the Pegasus III.

Design

The Gyroplane was a two-seat autogyro without wings, with a ducted fan pusher propeller driven by a 200 hp (150 kW) Lycoming IO-360 piston engine.  It had a three-bladed rotor, formed from bonded aluminium. There were flapping hinges but no drag hinges. In normal flight the rotor was undriven, but the design team were keen to enable vertical jump starts, an autogyro technique which spins up the rotor before take off without forward movement over the ground. The first prototype used conspicuous tip jets fed directly with compressed air from a fuselage-mounted cylinder.

The fuselage was built on a light alloy box beam which carried the cabin, engine mounting, rotor pylon and propeller duct. The well-glazed cabin seated two in tandem in front of the engine.  Entry was via a starboard-side door; dual controls were fitted.  Yaw was controlled with a rudder mounted within the propeller duct, enhancing its low-speed effectiveness.  The Gyroplane had a fixed tricycle undercarriage. The main wheels were mounted on steel cantilever legs and the nosewheel castered.

Specifications (certification aircraft)

See also

References

Single-engined pusher autogyros
1960s Canadian civil aircraft